Too Hot to Handle: Brazil (Portuguese: Brincando com Fogo: Brasil; Literally: Playing with Fire: Brazil) is a Brazilian reality television dating game show based on the American–British series of the same name, which premiered on Netflix on July 21, 2021, as part of a two-week event.

Hosted by a virtual assistant named "Lana", the show revolves around 10 adults – all of whom primarily engage in meaningless flings and are unable to form long-lasting relationships – who are placed together in a house for four weeks and must go through various workshops, all while being forbidden from any kissing, sexual contact or self-gratification, with the monetary prize getting reduced any time a rule is broken.

Netflix renewed Too Hot to Handle: Brazil for a second season on November 23, 2021. Netflix then first released Season 2 on September 28, 2022.

Premise
Hosted by a cone-shaped virtual assistant named "Lana", the show revolves around a group of adults – all of whom primarily engage in meaningless flings and are unable to form long-lasting relationships – who are placed together in a house for four weeks. While there, the contestants must go through various workshops, all while being forbidden from any kissing, sexual contact or self-gratification. The idea behind this is to foster genuine connections between the participants. The contestants start with a R$500,000 grand prize that gets reduced any time a rule is broken.

Each season starts with 10 new contestants, although later new additions occasionally join throughout. Similarly, contestants who are unable to form connections in the house or commit to the process are sometimes kicked out.

Cast

Season 1 (2021)

Future appearances 
After the series, in 2022, Brenda Paixão and Matheus Sampaio appeared as a couple in Power Couple Brasil 6. They won the competition.

Season 2 (2022)

Episodes

Season 1 (2021)

Season 2 (2022)

Production

Release 
The trailer for Too Hot to Handle: Brazil was released on June 30, 2021. With the trailer, it was announced that the eight-episode first season would  be released on a two-week schedule: the first four episodes were released on July 21, 2021, while the final four on July 28.

References

External links 
 

2021 Brazilian television series debuts
2021 Brazilian television seasons
Brazilian reality television series
Brazilian television series based on American television series
Dating and relationship reality television series
Portuguese-language Netflix original programming
Television series by Fremantle (company)
Television shows filmed in Brazil
Television shows set in Brazil
Works about sexual abstinence